
Coranto Lake is a lake in the San Pablo de Lípez Municipality and San Antonio de Esmoruco Municipality of the  Sur Lípez Province, Potosí Department, Bolivia. At an elevation of 4382 m, its surface area is 7.6 km².

References 

Lakes of Potosí Department